"Wait" is a song by American pop rock band Maroon 5. It was released on January 16, 2018 to contemporary hit radio as the fourth single from the band's sixth studio album Red Pill Blues (2017). The song was previously released as a promotional single on October 31, 2017. It was written by Adam Levine, John Ryan, Jacob Kasher Hindlin, and Ammar Malik and was produced by Ryan. It served as the third countdown single released from the album following "Whiskey".

Background and release
"Wait" was announced on October 30, 2017. The song was released as an instant-grant the following day worldwide. On November 3, 2017, guitarist James Valentine later announced on Twitter, that the song would later become the album's official fourth single.

Remixes
The remix versions of the song was released, the first version by Chromeo on January 19, 2018 and the second version featuring rapper A Boogie wit da Hoodie on January 26.

Composition
"Wait" has a duration of 3 minutes and 10 seconds. It was written by Maroon 5 frontman Adam Levine, John Ryan, Jacob "JKash" Kasher Hindlin, and Ammar Malik and was produced by John Ryan.

Music video
The music video for "Wait" was released on February 8, 2018 on Vevo. The video features actress Alexandra Daddario and was directed by Dave Meyers. It begins with lead singer Adam Levine at the church as he wakes up in a coffin and later walks to another coffin with people appeared at the funeral, there he used the scorpion to resurrect his ex girlfriend (played by Daddario) who the one cheated on him. With scenes of Levine getting attacked and fight by the ex girlfriend including the women gangsters and the bathtub woman. The next scene, Levine is on the water from another world with little mermaids as he enters the junkyard with the ex girlfriend watching him as millions of fireballs destroyed the place with the ex girlfriend is blown away. The final scene, the ex girlfriend breaks up and leaves Levine at the house with strings all over him ending the video.

Snapchat version video
On January 16, 2018, a Snapchat version video was released on Spotify and on Vevo, the following day. Directed by Travis Schneider, and was shot on iPhone 7. The video follows Levine in various parts at his home, as he performs in lip-syncing to the song with scenes covered by different Snapchat filters. Levine's wife, Behati Prinsloo makes a cameo appearance.

Lyric videos
A vertical lyric video was released exclusively by Spotify on December 15, 2017. Like the Snapchat video, which was also directed by Schneider and features Levine, is writing the lyrics on a screen wall. On February 1, 2018, the official lyric video is directed and produced by the band's multi-instrumentalist Sam Farrar. It was shot entirely on iPhone X.

Live performances
On November 7, 2017, Maroon 5 performed "Wait" for the first time at the iHeartRadio Theater in Burbank, California. On January 18, 2018, the band continued the song for Jimmy Kimmel Live!, as well as the 2018 iHeartRadio Music Awards on March 11. Pop band Echosmith, praised their latter performance as "one of the best sounding tv performances". They also performed the song on the final night of the 2018 Capital One JamFest in San Antonio, on April 1, 2018. Later, Maroon 5 played with the song live on The Voice on April 24 and The Ellen DeGeneres Show on May 7, 2018, respectively.

Accolades

Track listing

Credits and personnel
Recording
 Recorded at Conway Recording Studios, Los Angeles, California

Personnel
 John Ryan – composition, production, keyboards, piano, synthesizer
 Ammar Malik – composition
 Adam Levine – lead vocals, songwriter
 James Valentine – lead and rhythm guitar
 Jesse Carmichael – keyboards, synthesizer
 Mickey Madden – bass guitar
 Matt Flynn – drums, percussion, electronic percussion
 PJ Morton – keyboards, synthesizer
 Sam Farrar – audio engineering
 Noah "Mailbox" Passovoy – engineering
 Jacob "JKash" Kasher Hindlin – composition
 Serban Ghenea – mix engineering
 Tom Coyne – mastering

Charts

Weekly charts

Year-end charts

Certifications

Release history

Notes

References

2017 songs
2018 singles
222 Records singles
Interscope Records singles
Maroon 5 songs
Songs written by Adam Levine
Songs written by John Ryan (musician)
Songs written by Jacob Kasher
Songs written by Ammar Malik
Music videos directed by Dave Meyers (director)
Vertically-oriented music videos
American contemporary R&B songs